Marc Cavell (Michael Canter) was a British painter and kinetic artist. Cavell was born on 8 November 1911 in England into a Jewish family. He died in May 1989 in Paris.

The work of Marc Cavell is unique in the use of raw materials to create the illusion of movement by multiple sets of lights, transparency effects, and reflections.

Having been influenced by Paul Cézanne, Cavell explored post-cubism methods and experimented with various materials. In 1950, he discovered distinctive artistic possibilities in light and movement.

Artistic career 
Cavell began his studies at the Central School of Arts and Crafts in London. He left England in 1930 to go to Paris, where he joined the Académie Julian and the Académie Ranson.

In 1948, under the tutelage of Albert Gleizes, Cavell participated in artistic research in the workshop of Saint-Rémy-de-Provence. In 1950, he exhibited at Nîmes, the Visconti gallery in Paris, and the Salon des Independants, mainly displaying cubist paintings.

Open to other forms of art, on Pablo Picasso’s advice he began to work on other surfaces such as textiles and ceramics. During this period, he was commissioned to participate in the decoration of Normandy and the French Embassy in Helsinki.

From 1955 to 1968, he conducted research and experiments on light and movement. His works drew their inspiration from the balance of the formal structures of Futurism.

External links 
 Marc Cavell, l'illusionniste (Connaissance des arts)
 Les symphonies de lumière de Marc Cavell (Le soir.be) French
 Artnet 
 Christies Art Auctions

1911 births
1989 deaths
20th-century British painters
British male painters
British expatriates in France
20th-century British male artists